Crater Bay is a bay located in Yankicha island of the Ushishir Islands, which are part of the Greater Kuril Chain, in the Russian Far East. This bay was formed by an active volcano (also named Ushishir).

The Russian Far East generates much revenue from tourism at Crater Bay.  The Kuril islands, being a part of the Pacific Ring of Fire, have several volcanoes.

References
Description
Map and information on spiders
Lithology and geochemistry of bottom sediments in the crater bay

External links
 Sakhalin Oblast

Bays of Sakhalin Oblast